Staphylinochrous pygmaea is a species of moth of the Anomoeotidae family. It is found in Nigeria.

References

Endemic fauna of Nigeria
Anomoeotidae
Insects of West Africa
Moths of Africa